James Hendry GC (20 December 1911 – 13 June 1941) was a Canadian corporal who was posthumously awarded the George Cross for gallantry and self-sacrifice displayed on 13 June 1941 while attempting to extinguish a fire in an explosives store.

Hendry was born in Falkirk, Scotland, on 20 December 1911 to John and Janet Hendry.  The family lived in Geraldton, Ontario, before the war with several working in the local gold mines.

George Cross
Hendry was serving with No.1 Tunnelling Company of the Corps of Royal Canadian Engineers, who had been given the task of digging the tunnel between Loch Spey and Loch Laggan in the Scottish Highlands to supply water to the British Aluminium works at Fort William, when a fire broke out in an explosives store near Loch Laggan.  He ordered his colleagues to run to safety and attempted to extinguish the blaze rather than attempt to escape the inevitable explosion.  The blast also killed his colleague Sapper John MacDougall Stewart, and seven more were injured.

Hendry was buried in Brookwood Military Cemetery in Surrey, England.  The Royal Canadian Engineers dedicated their range control building to the corporal in recognition of his bravery in 1994.  In August 2008, a memorial cairn honouring Corporal Hendry was unveiled at Loch Laggan near where he was killed.  The ceremony was attended by his last surviving brother, William Hendry, of Thunder Bay, Ontario.

References

External links
 CWGC: James Hendry

1911 births
1941 deaths
Canadian recipients of the George Cross
Burials at Brookwood Cemetery
People from Thunder Bay District
British emigrants to Canada
Canadian Army personnel of World War II
Royal Canadian Engineers soldiers
Canadian military personnel killed in World War II
Scottish military personnel
People from Falkirk